Dorthe Skovshoved Rasmussen (born 27 January 1960 in Copenhagen, Denmark) is a retired female long-distance runner from Denmark. She competed for her native country at two Summer Olympics: 1984 and 1992. Her best result was finishing in 13th place in the women's marathon at the 1984 Summer Olympics. She set her personal best in the classic distance (2:29.34) in 1989.

Achievements

References
 
 
 Profile at Association of Road Running Statisticians

1960 births
Living people
Danish female long-distance runners
Danish female marathon runners
Olympic athletes of Denmark
Athletes (track and field) at the 1984 Summer Olympics
Athletes (track and field) at the 1992 Summer Olympics
Athletes from Copenhagen